Amiral Tréhouart was the second and last  coast-defence ships built for the French Navy in the early 1890s. Completed in 1896, little is known about her service. During World War I, the ship served as a submarine tender. She was sold for scrap in 1920.

Design and description
The Bouvines-class coast-defence ships were ordered in accordance with the 's belief in the primacy of coastal defences and commerce raiding. They  displaced . Once in service they proved to roll badly so bilge keels were later fitted. The crew of the Bouvines class numbered 15 officers and 318 ratings; service as a flagship added 5 more officers and 33 more ratings.

The Bouvines-class ships were powered by two inclined horizontal triple-expansion steam engines, each driving one propeller shaft. Amiral Tréhouarts engines used steam provided by 16 Belleville boilers that exhausted through a single funnel.

Armament and armor
The Bouvines-class ships carried their main battery of two Canon de  Modèle 1887 guns in two single-gun turrets, one each fore and aft of the superstructure. Their secondary armament consisted of eight Canon de  Modèle 1892 guns, four of which were mounted in individual casemates. The other four were carried on pivot mounts with gun shields on the shelter deck directly above the four casemated guns on the corners of the superstructure.

Initially four Canon de  Modèle 1885 Hotchkiss guns were carried for defence from torpedo boats in the fighting top in the military mast, but this was later increased to eight, with the new guns on the superstructure. Initially ten  Hotchkiss revolving cannon were positioned on the superstructure, but this was reduced to three when the additional 47 mm guns were added. Two  torpedo tubes were mounted above the waterline, but they were removed in 1906.

The ships were intended to have  of the belt showing above the waterline, but they were overweight as completed and only  of the belt was above the waterline. The plates protecting the conning tower measured  in thickness.

Construction and career
Amiral Tréhouart, named for Admiral François Thomas Tréhouart, was authorized in the 1889 Naval Programme and was ordered from Arsenal de Lorient. The ship was laid down on 20 October 1890 under the name of Tréhouart and launched on 16 May 1893. She was given her final name on 25 March 1895 and was completed on 29 June 1896.

In 1914 Amiral Tréhouart became a submarine depot ship. She was sold for scrap on 4 July 1920, but was not broken up until 1922.

Citations

References

External links
 nice picture gallery of the ships once you scroll about 2/3 down

1893 ships
Bouvines-class ironclads